Telephone numbers in Somaliland use Somalia's country code +252.

See also
 Telephone numbers in Somalia
 Telecommunications in Somalia
 Telecommunications in Somaliland

References

Somaliland
Telecommunications in Somaliland
Telephone numbers